Spencer's Crossing Bridge, near Greeley, Kansas, was built in 1885. It was listed on the National Register of Historic Places in 1990. It has also been known as Greeley Bridge.

Its center span is a  Pratt through truss. The bridge was built by Wrought Iron Bridge Builders.

It is located about .1 mile north, and .6 miles west of Greeley.

References

Bridges on the National Register of Historic Places in Kansas
Infrastructure completed in 1885
Anderson County, Kansas
Truss bridges